The 2010 Spokane Shock season was the fifth season for the franchise, and the first in the current incarnation of the Arena Football League, coming from the AF2, which dissolved following the 2009 season. The team is coached by Rob Keefe and played their home games at Spokane Veterans Memorial Arena.

Standings

Regular season schedule

The Shock, coming off of their ArenaCup X victory in the 2009 AF2 season, opened the 2010 season at home against the Iron on April 2. Their final regular season game was on the road against the Sharks.

Playoff schedule

All times are EDT

Roster

Regular season

Week 1: vs. Milwaukee Iron

The Shock were unable to keep up with the Iron and dropped their first game of the season. Turnovers assisted their downfall, losing a fumble on their first possession, and giving up an interception that was returned for a touchdown on the final play of the 1st half. The Shock were able to get within a touchdown of the Iron, but turned the ball over again late in the 4th quarter which led to a Milwaukee touchdown, putting the game out of reach. Spokane was able to score a touchdown on their ensuing drive, but as they did, the clock read zeroes and the game was over.

Making his AFL debut, quarterback Kyle Rowley completed 29 of 35 passes for 259 yards and 7 touchdowns, but also threw 3 interceptions. Huey Whittaker led all receivers with 97 yards and 4 touchdowns.

Week 2: at Utah Blaze

The Shock had their first win of the year after routing the host Utah Blaze. Spokane's defense did not allow a point in the 1st half, as the only two touchdowns scored by the Blaze were a pair of kickoff returns. Quarterback Kyle Rowley threw for 224 yards and 6 touchdowns. Markee White led all receivers with 118 yards and 2 touchdowns.

Week 3: vs. Bossier–Shreveport Battle Wings

The Shock defeated the Battle Wings in an offensive shootout for their second win of the year. The Shock's defense held the Battle Wings' P.J. Berry to just 4 receptions and 2 touchdowns, forcing Bossier–Shreveport quarterback Raymond Philyaw to look for other receivers. In the 4th quarter, Roderick Mosley came up with an interception that he returned 9 yards for a touchdown, allowing the Shock to pull ahead by a score of 65–47. The teams traded touchdowns for the rest of the game, and the clock eventually ran out on Bossier–Shreveport which gave the win to Spokane. Kyle Rowley finished the game with 316 yards and 8 touchdowns. All of his touchdown passes were to Raul Vijil, Markee White, or Huey Whittaker. Those three receivers combined for 301 yards.

Week 4: BYE

Week 5: vs. Cleveland Gladiators

The Shock lost to the previously winless Gladiators at home in the final seconds of the game, giving up 5 touchdowns to Cleveland in the final quarter. There were four lead changes in the final minute of the game. Spokane took a 61–59 lead with 46 seconds to go on a 2-yard touchdown reception by Huey Whittaker. Cleveland responded with a 27-yard touchdown pass with 35 seconds left, going up 65–61 following a missed extra point. The Shock engineered a 5-play drive that covered 45 yards and ended with a 4-yard touchdown catch by Raul Vijil with 8 seconds remaining, and they went up 68–65. However Cleveland's Brent Holmes took the ensuing kickoff 56 yards back for a touchdown, allowing the Gladiators to go up 72–68 with just 1.8 seconds left. Eddie Thompson received the final kickoff for the Shock as the clock ran out, but Spokane was allowed to run one final play thanks to an unsportsmanlike conduct penalty on Cleveland after their go-ahead score. Kyle Rowley's pass to Markee White fell incomplete, ending the game amidst the protests the Shock's fans, who wanted a defensive pass interference penalty called.

Rowley had a season-high 375 passing yards in the game along with 9 touchdowns, but also threw 2 interceptions. Huey Whittaker was the leading receiver with 11 catches for 149 yards and 3 touchdowns.

Week 6: at Arizona Rattlers

Week 7: at Oklahoma City Yard Dawgz

Week 8: vs. Utah Blaze

Week 9: vs. Jacksonville Sharks

Week 10: BYE

Week 11: at Orlando Predators

Week 12: vs. Tulsa Talons

Week 13: at Milwaukee Iron

Week 14: vs. Arizona Rattlers

Week 15: at Cleveland Gladiators

With their ninth straight win and a loss by the Arizona Rattlers, the Shock clinched the West Division.

Week 16: at Iowa Barnstormers

Improving their win streak to ten games, combined with a loss by the Chicago Rush, the Shock were certain to finish with the best record in the National Conference.

Week 17: vs. Chicago Rush

Week 18: at Jacksonville Sharks

Playoffs

National Conference Semifinals: vs. Arizona Rattlers

National Conference Championship: vs. Milwaukee Iron

ArenaBowl XXIII: vs. Tampa Bay Storm

References

Spokane Shock
Spokane Shock seasons
ArenaBowl champion seasons